A Great Day can refer to:

 "A Great Day" (Beavis and Butt-head episode), an episode of the American animated television series Beavis and Butt-head
 "A Great Day" (Code Lyoko episode), "Un grand jour", 30th episode of the French animated television series Code Lyoko
 A Great Day (short film), a short fiction film directed by Adoor Gopalakrishnan in 1965